Officine Panerai (also known simply as Panerai) is an Italian luxury watch manufacturer, and a wholly owned subsidiary of Compagnie Financière Richemont S.A.

Officine Panerai designs, manufactures and markets watches through authorized dealers and company-owned stores worldwide. Giovanni Panerai (1825–1897) founded Officine Panerai in Florence, Italy in 1860.

The company is headquartered in Geneva and manufactures watches in Neuchâtel, Switzerland using movements manufactured by Manufacture Horlogère ValFleurier.

Panerai watches, designed and manufactured by Rolex SA, were worn by the frogmen of the Decima Flottiglia MAS in their operations during World War II. Notable products include the Luminor and Radiomir wristwatches.

History

Giovanni Panerai (1825–1897) opened up his first watch shop in Florence, Italy in 1860. Giovanni's grandson Guido Panerai (1873–1934) expanded the watch shop "Orologeria Svizzera" and took over his wife's family business, a mechanical workshop. In 1915, Guido Panerai invented gun sights that were illuminated by a radium-226/zinc sulfide powder enclosed in small, hermetically sealed vessels. Radiomir, the name for the radium-based luminous mixture is derived from "radio mire", which is Italian for "radium sights".
Panerai became an official supplier to the Regia Marina (the Royal Italian Navy), supplying a variety of technical equipment and precision instruments. All Panerai watches, except for the GPF 2/56 were designed and manufactured by Rolex SA using pocket watch movements made by Swiss manufacturer Cortébert. The main driving forces behind the production of the first professional diving watches were Hans Wilsdorf of Rolex and Giuseppe Panerai.

The Florence-based workshop produced wrist-worn diving instruments and, between 1935 and 1970, delivered around 1,600 watches (c. 35 2533s, 1000 3646s, 24 6152s, 36 6154s, 500 6152/1s, and 60 GPF 2/56s), most of them to the Italian Marina Militare. All watches, except for the GPF 2/56, were made by Rolex, and G. Panerai e Figlio produced only the dials for these watches. Panerai dials were rendered luminous with Radiomir, a highly radioactive radium-based self-luminous compound, and later in around 1965, with Luminor, a harmless compound activated by tritium.

The GPF 2/56 (Egiziano Grosso) was produced for the Egyptian Navy in 1956. By 1970, the company ceased to provide watches to the Marina Militare, as they were neither cost-effective nor met the naval specifications. In 1993 it then moved to launch its products in the civilian market. Following its acquisition of Panerai, Richemont repositioned Panerai as a luxury watch brand and increased prices.

Products

Panerai offers watches across four marketing lines: Historic, Contemporary, Manifattura and Special Editions in runs of 500, 1000, 2,000 or 4,000 units; each with its issue number on the case back. The company issues Special Editions by year. For example, in 2006 issued the 1936 California Dial Radiomir special edition, a reissue of the first Panerai model presented to the Italian Marina Militare with production limited to 1936 units.

Ferrari branded Panerai products
When Ferrari's contract with rival watchmaker Girard-Perregaux expired in 2005, Ferrari and Panerai entered into a five-year agreement to design, manufacture and distribute Panerai watches carrying the Ferrari trademark. The collection was branded Ferrari engineered by Panerai  and consisted of two product lines marketed as  "Granturismo" and "Scuderia". The collection consisted of 11 models priced between US$5,000 and US$30,000. The Panerai-ferrari partnership ended in 2010.

Models 

 Panerai Luminor
Panerai Luminor 1950
 Panerai Radiomir
Panerai Radiomir 1940
Panerai Luminor Due
Panerai Ferrari
Panerai Luminor Submersible 1950

See also
 List of Italian companies

Notes

References

External links

 

 The History Of Panerai Watches At A Glance
 Vintage Panerai under the loupe at Perezcope
 
 Panerai during World War Two
 
 Review of the famous PAM590
 Luminor 2020 – Debunking Panerai's fictional history of tritium-based lume

Italian companies established in 1860
Italian brands
Luxury brands
Manufacturing companies based in Florence
Military equipment of Italy
Richemont brands
Watch brands
Watch manufacturing companies of Italy
Watch movement manufacturers